Xi’an Hanova International School is an international school established in Xi'an, China in 2012.

The school is independently owned and operated and teaches an international curriculum. The school is supported by local government educational authorities.

Students aged 3 to 18 and professional staff from 26 different countries make up the student body. As of 2018, the school had 240+ international students, and all classes, activities, and subjects were taught in English, with the exception of non-English modern languages (Chinese, Korean, French, Spanish).

Hanova International School is approved to offer the IB PYP (Primary Years Programme), IB MYP (Middle Years Programme), IB DP (Diploma Programme), and Cambridge International General Certificate of Secondary Education.

A wide range of activities are available to supplement the curriculum during and after school hours, as well as on weekends. These activities include sports, arts, language and cultural clubs and competitive teams in Football, Basketball, Swimming, Athletics, Arts & Crafts, Webpage Design, Chess Club, English, Cooking, Robotics, Chinese Language & Culture, Gardening, Scrapbooking, Media Club, Choir and Band.

Alumni graduated since 2013 have mostly joined universities considered within the top 100 of the world’s global ranking.

The school is currently located in its initial campus, while a new state-of-the art campus is planned by 2021.

School Information 
Founding date:  September 2012

Managing Director: Julia Jiang

Principal: Robert Muntzer

Accreditations & affiliations: Authorized IB World School for PYP (Primary Years Programme), MYP (Middle Years Programme) and DP (Diploma Programme). Authorized Cambridge School for IGCSE (International General Certificates for Secondary Education). WASC (Western Association of Schools and Colleges) accreditation.

Type: Preschool, Primary, Secondary and Senior School

Age of students: 3–18 years

Number of student: 240+

Nationality of students: 26 countries (January 2018)

Education/Curriculum: IB Diploma Programme, IB Middle Years Programme, IB Primary Years Programme, Cambridge International General Certificate for Secondary Education.

Primary teaching language: English

Modern Languages taught: Chinese, Korean, Spanish, French, German

School hours: 8:45 am–4:00pm

School sports mascot: Hanova Heroes

School houses: Han, Qin, Song, Tang

School facilities: Classrooms, Music Room, Drama and Fitness Room, Design and Art Rooms, Science Laboratories, Auditorium, Library, Football Field, Basketball Fields, Running Tracks, Outdoor Playground and Recreation Areas, access to Indoor Swimming Pool and Gymnasium.

School hours: 8:45 am–3:45pm

References

External links

 Xi'an Hanova International School
 List of Xi'an International Schools

High schools in Shaanxi
International schools in China
International Baccalaureate schools in China
Schools in Xi'an
Educational institutions established in 2012
2012 establishments in China